"Cross Over" is the fifth single by the Japanese girl idol group 9nine. It was released in Japan on December 1, 2010, on the label SME Records (a subsidiary of Sony Music Entertainment Japan).

The physical CD single debuted at number 25 in the Oricon weekly singles chart.

Background 
The song "Cross Over" was the ending theme of the first half of the first and only season of the Japanese anime television series .

Release 
The single was released in three versions: a regular edition, a limited edition, and a Star Driver edition. Each version had a different cover. The limited edition A included a bonus DVD with the music video for the title track.

Track listing

Charts

References

External links 
  (The video is available only in Japan.)
 Profiles at Sony Music
 Limited Edition
 Regular Edition
 Star Driver Edition

2013 singles
Japanese-language songs
9nine songs
2013 songs
SME Records singles
Song articles with missing songwriters